, also known by the shorthand form , is a Japanese mass media publishing company founded on October 1, 1966. The company publishes mainly physical home media on compact discs, including music, films and TV shows and video games. It is affiliated with the Japanese media group Fujisankei Communications Group. Pony Canyon is a major leader in the music industry in Japan, with its artists regularly at the top of the Japanese charts. Pony Canyon is also responsible for releasing taped concerts from its artists as well as many anime and feature film productions.

Pony Canyon is headquartered in Tokyo with offices in Taiwan, Malaysia and South Korea. It employs approximately 360 people. Pony Canyon also owns the recording label Flight Master.

History 
On October 1, 1966, Nippon Broadcasting System, Inc. opened  a new record label division, called as Nippon Broadcasting System Service, Inc., in order to produce and market music from Japanese artists. The division formally changed its name in 1970 to Pony Inc. in order to match the brand names it had been using previously. These were "PONYPak" for 8-track cassettes from 1967, and "PONY" for cassettes from 1968.

On August 1, 1970, another Japanese record label, Canyon Records Inc. was founded. Like Pony Inc., Canyon Records was part of the Fujisankei Communications Group. Canyon Records was financially backed at 60% by Pony Inc. and at 40% by Pony's parent company Nippon Broadcasting System.

In 1982, Pony ventured into interactive content by producing  personal computer game software under the name "Ponyca". In 1984, the company entered license agreements with major overseas companies, MGM/UA Home Video, Vestron Video International, Walt Disney Home Video and BBC Video (the company also entered license agreements with major overseas companies, RCA/Columbia Pictures International Video in 1986), and in 1985, they established offices in New York and London. In 1986, Pony signed licensing agreements with A&M Records and in 1989 with Virgin Records to handle both companies' Japanese CD releases.

On October 21, 1987, Pony Inc. and Canyon Records merged their operations to form Pony Canyon Inc.

In 1990, Pony Canyon branched out, and opened five subsidiaries outside Japan, one of them is a subsidiary in Singapore called Skin which was managed by Jimmy Wee and signed local English language performers such as Gwailo, Art Fazil, Chris Vadham, The Lizards' Convention, Humpback Oak and Radio Active. In addition to Singapore, Pony Canyon has also had a subsidiary in Taiwan, and a joint venture in Hong Kong and South Korea, named as Golden Pony and SAMPONY, respectively. Four of five subsidiaries were closed in 1997 due to Asian financial crisis, leaving the Malaysian subsidiary as the only subsidiary to remain in operation. However, the Hong Kong and Korean operations were reestablished as a wholly owned subsidiary, although the Korean operation had a 16% stake of local partner. In 2003, the Hong Kong and Taiwan branch of Pony Canyon, both affected by the financial crisis, were acquired by Forward Music. In 2018, Pony Canyon reestablished its branch in Taiwan.

As a video game producer, Pony Canyon brought the Ultima series from Origin Systems and the Advanced Dungeons and Dragons series from Strategic Simulations to Nintendo's Family Computer. Between 1986 and 1990, they produced remakes of the first four Ultima titles for the MSX2 and NES platforms. These remakes differed from the original versions, with rewritten game code and all-new graphics. Pony Canyon's video game library was generally released in North America by FCI. Pony Canyon has not released any video games since Virtual View: Nemoto Harumi for the PlayStation 2 in July 2003.

The company has occasionally been involved in film production. For example, they were a co-production company for the 1996 Indian erotic film Kama Sutra: A Tale of Love.

Following a merger with Nippon Broadcasting System, Fuji Television Network, Inc. became the major shareholder of Pony Canyon in 2006. The following year, Fuji Television made Pony Canyon its wholly owned subsidiary. Fuji Television was subsequently renamed Fuji Media Holdings in 2008. Despite associations with Fuji Television, not all of Pony Canyon's TV show and movie library has been broadcast on Fuji Television. Some of Pony Canyon's non-Fuji TV catalog includes Doraemon movies.

In September 2014, Pony Canyon opened a North American anime distribution label, Ponycan USA, which aims to license their titles for streaming and home video in US and Canada. Their home video releases will be distributed exclusively by Right Stuf Inc.

Music artists 

Below is a selected list of musical artists signed under the Pony Canyon label in the past and present.

 +Plus (2009–2011)
 A.B.C-Z
 Aaron Yan
 Agnes Chan (1988–2000)
 Ai Higuchi (2021–present)
 Ai Maeda
 aiko
 Aimi (2011–2013)
 Akari Kito
 Akiko Matsumoto
 The Alfee (1979–1997)
 Alyssa Milano (1988–1993)
 Ami Wajima
 Arashi (1999–2001)
 Asaka Seto (1995–1996, 2002)
 Asriel (2014–2015)
 Λucifer (1999–2000)
 Aya Ueto
 Ayana Taketatsu
 B1A4 (Korean idol group)
 Babyraids Japan (2012–2018)
 Bananarama
 Band-Maid (2020–present)
 Beatcats (2020–present)
 Berryz Koubou
 Billie Hughes
 Blood Stain Child
 The Brow Beat (2021–present)
 Buono! (2007–2010)
 The Burning Deadwoods
 By-Sexual (1990–1995)
 CHAGE and ASKA (1985–1997)
 The Checkers (1981–1992)
 Cherryblossom (2007–2010)
 Chiharu Matsuyama (1977–1980)
 Chihiro Yonekawa (2013) (one release)
 Cinema Staff (2012–2019)
 COBRA (1990–1991)
 COMA-CHI
 Combattimento Consort Amsterdam
 Crayon Pop (Korean idol group)
 Cute (Korea only)
 D-51
 Daisy×Daisy (2010–2013)
 Dave Rodgers (1981–1990)
 David Lasley
 Defspiral
 DIALOGUE+ (2019–present)
 Dreamcatcher (Korean idol group)
 Ebisu Muscats
 eill (2021–present)
 Emi Fujita
 Emiri Kato
 Ensemble Planeta
 Eri Kitamura (2004)
 Eyedi (2018–present)
 Fahrenheit (Japan release)
 Flame
 fripSide (2008)
 Fuga Miura (2021–present)
 Fumiya Fujii
 Funkist (2008–2012)
 GARNiDELiA (2021–present)
 Glay
 GOING UNDER GROUND (2010–2011)
 HALO (Korean idol group)
 Hanako Oku
 harmoe (2021–present)
 Happatai (band)
 Hi-Fi CAMP (2011–2013)
 Hinano Yoshikawa (1997–1999)
 Hinano (2022–present)
 Hiro Shimono
 Hiro Takahashi (1993–1995)
 Hiroko Hayashi
 Hiromi Sato
 Idoling!!! (2007–2015)
 Jamil (2010–2011)
 Jang Keun-suk
 John Hoon
 Jun Fukuyama
 Kaori Ishihara
 Kana Hanazawa (2021–present)
 Kazuki Kato
 Kei Aran
 Keita Tachibana
 Kikuko Inoue
 Kim Samuel (Korean Soloist)
 Kitarō (1979–1981)
 Kokia (1998–1999)
 Kreva (2004–2016)
 Kroi (2021–present)
 Kuhaku Gokko (2021–present)
 Kym Campbell (Japan)
 Kyoko Fukada (1998–2003)
 Le Couple (1994–2005)
 Lead
 Leaf Squad
 Little Black Dress (2021–present)
 LM.C
 Maaya Uchida
 MAGIC PARTY (2010–2012)
 Maison Book Girl (2018–2021)
 Mamiko Takai (1986–2010)
 Mao Abe
 Marc van Roon (Japan/South Korea)
 MARiA (2021–present)
 Mariya Takeuchi
 Masako Mori (1979–2008)
 Masato Shimon (1987, 2003, 2010)
 Masayoshi Oishi
 Mayumi Kojima (1995–2009)
 MC Sniper
 Megumi Odaka (1988–2002)
 Miki Matsubara (1979–1986)
 Mikuni Shimokawa (1999–2009, 2017)
 Milky Bunny (2011–2013)
 Miyuki Imori (1985–2007)
 Miyuki Kanbe (2003–2004)
 Miyuki Nakajima (1975–1999)
 Nana Okada
 Naohito Fujiki
 Naoko Ken (1975–2014)
 Nature (Korean idol group)
 Non Stop Rabbit (2020–present)
 Official Hige Dandism
 onelifecrew (2010)
 Onyanko Club (1985–2002)
 Original Love (1995–2006)
 OxT
 Paradise Lost
 Park Yong-ha (2004–2010)
 .Paul Mauriat. (After Philips)
 PelleK (2022–present)
 The Pillows (1991–1994)
 Reiko Chiba (1994–1996)
 Ricki-Lee Coulter
 Roger Joseph Manning, Jr.
 Romeo (Korean idol group)
Rumdarjun
 S/mileage
 Saki Fukuda
 Sam Roberts
 Sata Andagi (2010–2013)
 Sayuri Ishikawa
 Segawa Ayaka
 Sexy Zone
 she
 Shiho Nanba (2010–2012, 2018)
 Shinji Takeda (1995–1996)
 Shinji Tanimura (1995–1999)
 Shinsei Kamattechan (2017, 2020)
 Shizuka Kudo
 Show Lo
 Shunichi Toki
 SiM (2022–present)
 Shoose (2020–present)
 Smewthie (2021–present)
 Smiley*2G
 SOMETIME'S (2021–present)
 Sound Horizon
 SS501 (Korean idol group)
 SuG (2010–2017)
 Suzuko Mimori
 Taegoon (2009–2010)
 Takeshi Tsuruno
 Team H
 TiA (2011–)
 toku (2021–present)
 Toshihiko Tahara (1980–1998, 2004)
 Tsukiko Amano (2001–2006)
 Tunnels (1986–1999)
 Uchoten (1986–1988)
 Uzi
 Van Ness Wu (Japanese albums only)
 Watari Roka Hashiritai (2009–2013)
 Wataru Urata
 Weather Girls
 w-inds.
 The Wild Magnolias (2002) (one release)
 World Order (2012–2014) (three releases)
 Yoko Hikasa
 Yoko Minamino (2005) (one release)
 Yoshimi Iwasaki (1980–1987)
 Yoshino Kimura (1998–2001)
 Yu Yamada
 Yui Ichikawa (2003–2005)
 Yuki Saito (1985–1999)
 Yukiko Okada (1983–1986)
 Yuko Ando (2020–present)
 Yuko Takeuchi (1998) (one release)
 Yurika Endo
 Yurika Kubo
 Yuu Miyashita (2020–present)
 Zeebra (2003–2010)

Composers 
 Yasuharu Takanashi (Fairy Tail, First series only)

Video games 
Below is a selected list of video games either developed or published by the Pony Canyon label.

 Attack Animal Gakuen
 Back to the Future
 Bubble Ghost
 Dr. Chaos
 Final Justice
 Fruit Panic
 Hacker
 Hydlide
 Jungle Wars 2 – Kodai Mahou Ateimos no Nazo
 Kabuki-chou Reach Mahjong: Toupuusen
 Koi wa Kakehiki
 Lunar Pool
 Malaya's Treasure
 Onita Atsushi FMW
 Onyanko Town
 Out Run
 Penguin Land
 Phantom Fighter
 Pit Fall
 The Police Story
 Shiroi Ringu he
 Shogi
 Sokoban
 Super Pitfall
 Tasmania Story
 TanTan Tanuki
 Ultima I: The First Age of Darkness
 Ultima II: The Revenge of the Enchantress
 Ultima III: Exodus
 Ultima IV: Quest of the Avatar
 Zanac

Anime 
Below is a list of anime series licensed for streaming and home video release in North America by Pony Canyon's Ponycan USA label.

 Clean Freak! Aoyama kun 
 Cute High Earth Defense Club Love! (Seasons 1 & 2)
 Days
 Denkigai no Honya-san
 Etotama
 Garakowa: Restore the World
 Kuromukuro (Netflix Original)
 Lance N' Masques
 The Lost Village
 Rokka: Braves of the Six Flowers
 Sanrio Boys
 Sound! Euphonium (Seasons 1 & 2)
 Welcome to the Ballroom
 Yuki Yuna is a Hero

See also 
 List of record labels
 Master of Entertainment

References

External links 

 
 
 

 
1966 establishments in Japan
Anime companies
Fuji TV
Fujisankei Communications Group
Home video companies of the United States
Home video distributors
IFPI members
Japanese record labels
Jazz record labels
Mass media companies based in Tokyo
Record labels established in 1966
Software companies based in Tokyo
Video game companies of Japan